is a BS-TBS discussions program.

The program talks about social issues of Japan and thoroughly discusses how foreign journalists in Japan who report for mass media outside of Japan look at these issues.

The program was ended on September 30, 2018.

Cast
 MC :Patrick Harlan, Mai Demizu
 Several foreign journalists in Japan
 Guest

External links
 

2015 in Japanese television